In film, diegesis refers to the story world, and the events that occur within it. Thus, non-diegesis are things which occur outside the story-world. 

A non-diegetic insert is a film technique that combines a shot or a series of shots cut into a sequence, showing objects represented as being outside the space of the narrative. Put more simply, a non-diegetic insert is a scene that is outside the story world which is "inserted" into the story world. Diegetic could also refer to sound in media or film studies.

Examples
 Three images shown during the disastrous opening night of the play in The Band Wagon, as a metaphor to highlight how much of a flop the show is.
 Sky sequences shown in Gus Van Sant's Elephant.
Most famously in The Great Train Robbery a bandit, either following the character's death or before the narrative began, shot his gun directly at the audience.
 Starting scene of Charlie Chaplin's film Modern Times.

Film and video terminology